Young Communists (in Catalan: Joves Comunistes) is the youth wing of PSUC viu in Catalonia, Spain. It was initially known as Joves Comunistes del PSUC viu. JC publishes Veu Rebel. JC is a federated organisation to the Communist Youth Union of Spain(UJCE) since April 2006 

The highest organ of JC is the Congress. The Congress elects a Central Committee that leads the organization between congresses. Out of the Central Committee a Standing Committee is elected, which runs the day-to-day affairs of the organization. The present general secretary of JC is Jorge Torres.

See also
Collectives of Young Communists – Communist Youth

External links
 www.jovescomunistes.cat

Youth wings of communist parties
Youth wings of political parties in Spain